Red Victor 2 is a 1972 Vauxhall Victor owned by British mechanic Andy Frost. Frost purchased the car in 1981 and began customizing it as a hobby; it was once believed to be the fastest street legal car in the world, and now boasts over 2,300 hp. But since it is not a production car, it is not officially considered to hold the record.

The car was previously named the Red Victor One.

Statistics

Engine
The car was purchased with an original 104 horsepower, 2000cc four cylinder motor.  Following a number of engine iterations, the car is now powered by a 572ci Twin Turbo Chevrolet V8.

Specs as follows:

Dart big M block
Lunati pro series 4340 forged crank
Oliver billet steel rods
Diamond turbo pistons
Speed pro "Hellfire" rings
Aviaid 4 stage dry sump pump
Modified Aviaid oil pan
Altiss engineering custom oil pump drive, oil tank and breather can
Jesel cam belt drive
Don Bailey designed Comp Cams custom turbo roller cam
Comp Cams H/D roller lifters
Manton 210deg 7/16" ex pushrods,Comp cams 7/16" intake
Cometic multi layer steel head gaskets
ARP heads studs
Dart Pro1 355 CNC heads with Ferrea stainless intake and super alloy exhaust valves modified by RFD developments
Edelbrock 454R intake manifold modified by Altiss for 2 x 1500cc Ford motorsport injectors per cylinder 
Manley valve springs
T+D 1.75 shaft rockers
Ali rocker covers modded by Altiss
Custom 321 stainless headers by Altiss c/w2 x Turbosmart pro wastegates
Burns 321 stainless merge collectors and Custom 321 stainless 4.5" exhaust system
Turbonetics "Godzilla" BOV
Billet 2200cfm throttle body
Custom throttle body hat CNC'd by Taylor machine and finished by Altiss
2 x ARE cooling 12"x7"x 13""" Air to water cores,c/w 8 gallon water tank. Tanks fabricated by Altiss

Turbos
2 x Holset 88mm custom hybrid turbos spec'd by Holset with inconel exhaust wheels

Miscellaneous
The vehicle runs on Shell v-power pump fuel with Power Pour additive.
It uses a Ford 9 inch rear end connected to a custom 2 speed transmission built by Andy Frost and Penn Autos.
Front brakes are 290mm vented discs, with custom four pot calipers. On the rear, 260mm vented discs with custom pads. All built by Hi-Spec.

Figures and Records
 Speed records:

0-60 mph =0.9secs
0-150 mph = 5.0secs
0-189 mph = 7.6secs
Standing 1/4 = 7.41 & 197 mph at this time.
top speed = 223 mph, and no bodywork came off. This was done at Bruntingthorpe in Sept 2008. That speed attained in a slow 19 seconds due to excessive wheelspin and coming out of the throttle.

Street Eliminator speed record holder 190.4 mph.

World pump gas ET and speed record holder on MT 315 radials 7.67 at 190.4 mph.

King of Europe winner 2009. King of Europe speed and ET record holder 7.81 at 188 mph.

UK Castrol challenge winner in 2006 and 2007.

The Future 
Andy Frost built the successor to RedVictor2, an evolution of the original car, RedVictor3 is being built to campaign in Pro Modified in the European FIA Championship, whilst still maintaining the street legal status that forms the core ethos of the racing team. The build of the updated car is being covered here RedVictor3 build diary

Red Victor 3
In mid-2011 performance specs for the still in production  RedVictor3 were released by VXR. It uses an 8.8L Twin Turbo engine producing 3000 hp at the rear-wheel. Red Victor 3 will still be street legal, and use pump-gas on the street. Thus it will be quicker than Larry Larson's '66 Nova, which recently trumped Red Victor 1 as the fastest street legal vehicle.
It was the world's quickest and fastest street legal car in the 1/4 mile as of June 2012, with a 6.59 @ 220 mph elapsed time.

A car built by Jeff Lutz called Mad Max, is as of 2016, the fastest street legal in the world with a time of 5.85 @250 mph.

Notes and references

External Reading 
BBC Feature on Red Victor 2
Official Red Victor Website

Individual cars